Ring Tour 2009 is the name of Miliyah Kato's third tour. It was released as a DVD on May 26, 2010. The DVD was recorded on November 18, 2009 at the Nippon Budokan arena. It's the #34 Music DVD of 2010 in Japan.

Track listing 
 Love, Power & Soul
 
 Breathe Again
 Medley (Dear Lonely Girl, Kiss, Tough, Lalala, Love Is..., Ai ga Kieta)
 Love
 
 Love for You
 This is Love
 Dance Tonight
 
 Power
 20 (Cry)
 
 
 Time is Money
 Why
 Soul 
 Aitai (I miss you)
 Love Me, Hold Me
 19 Memories
 People
 Love Forever
 
 Happy Celebration
 
 Ending

Charts and sales

External links 
 Official website

2010 video albums
2010 live albums
Miliyah Kato albums
Live video albums
Albums recorded at the Nippon Budokan